The 2016 IIHF U18 World Championship was the 18th IIHF World U18 Championship, and was hosted by Grand Forks, North Dakota, USA. The tournament was played in April 2016.

Venues

Top Division

Officials
The IIHF selected 12 referees and 10 linesmen to work the 2016 IIHF U18 World Championship.
They were the following:

Referees
  Vladimir Baluska
  Jacob Grumsen
  Roystian Hansen
  Jan Hribik
  Sirko Hunnius
  Jeff Ingram
  Marcus Linde
  Jari-Pukka Pajula
  Brett Sheva
  Viktor Trilar
  Cameron Voss
  Shane Warschaw

Linesmen
  Andrew Dalton
  Jake Davis
  Dmitry Golyak
  Johannes Kack
  David Nothegger
  Tibor Rovensky
  Joonas Saha
  Libor Suchanek
  Alexander Sysuev
  Nathan Vanoosten

Preliminary round

Group A

All times are local. (Central Daylight Time – UTC−05:00)

Group B

All times are local. (Central Daylight Time – UTC−05:00)

Relegation round

Playoff round

Quarterfinals

Semifinals

,

Bronze medal game

Final

Scoring leaders

List shows the top ten skaters sorted by points, then goals.

 GP = Games played; G = Goals; A = Assists; Pts = Points; +/− = Plus-minus; PIM = Penalties In MinutesSource: IIHF.com

Leading goaltenders

Only the top five goaltenders, based on save percentage, who have played 40% of their team's minutes are included in this list.

 TOI = Time On Ice (minutes:seconds); SA = Shots against; GA = Goals against; GAA = Goals against average; Sv% = Save percentage; SO = ShutoutsSource: IIHF.com

Tournament awards

Most Valuable Player
 Forward:  Clayton Keller

All-star team
 Goaltender:  Ukko-Pekka Luukkonen
 Defencemen:  Adam Fox,  David Quenneville
 Forwards:  Tyson Jost,  Jesse Puljujärvi,  Clayton Keller

IIHF best player awards
 Goaltender:  Filip Gustavsson
 Defenceman:  Adam Fox
 Forward:  Tyson Jost
References:

Final standings

Division I

Division I A

The Division I A tournament was played in Minsk, Belarus, from April 9 to 15, 2016.

Division I B

The Division I B tournament was played in Asiago, Italy, from April 18 to 24, 2016.

Division II

Division II A

The Division II A tournament was played in Brasov, Romania, from April 4 to 10, 2016.

Division II B

The Division II B tournament was played in Valdemoro, Spain, from March 26 to April 1, 2016.

Division III

Division III A

The Division III A tournament was played in Sofia, Bulgaria, from March 14 to 20, 2016.

Division III B

The Division III B tournament was played in Cape Town, South Africa, from February 14 to 19, 2016.

References

External links
Website

 
IIHF World U18 Championships
IIHF World U18 Championships
Sports in Grand Forks, North Dakota
2016
2015–16 in American ice hockey
IIHF World U18
April 2016 sports events in the United States
Ice hockey competitions in North Dakota